The 1947 season was the Chicago Bears' 28th in the National Football League.  The team failed to improve on their 8–2–1 record from 1946 and finished with an  8–4 record, under head coach George Halas, but the team finished second in the NFL Western Division behind their inner-city rivals the Chicago Cardinals missing out on an NFL title game appearance.

Before the season

Draft

Schedule

Standings

References

Chicago Bears
1947
Chicago Bears